Château André Ziltener is a château in Chambolle-Musigny, Côte-d'Or, France. It houses a hotel and a winery.

It was the monks of the Cistercian order who made the land in Burgundy arable, and who resided here until the French Revolution. They also laid the foundations for viticulture in this world-renowned wine region.

In 1709, the château was constructed at the request of the first president of the Burgundian parliament, on the foundations of an old Cistercian priory. It is situated in the region of the famous Château du Clos de Vougeot, and surrounded by many world-famous vineyards.

The château has been at the center of Burgundy’s history for centuries. In the 18th and 19th centuries it served as the residence of numerous important politicians and noblemen.

In 1991 it was purchased by the Ziltener family and completely converted and renovated. Two years later, in 1993, it was opened to the public as a four-star hotel, and is now a premium destination for wine lovers from all over the world.

External links 
 Château André Ziltener

Châteaux in Côte-d'Or